The Cohen crime family, or the Siegel-Cohen crime syndicate, was a Jewish-Italian crime family that was active from 1933 to 1961. The family was founded by New York Jewish mobster Benjamin "Bugsy" Siegel in the early 1930s. He had Los Angeles Mafia boss Jack Dragna and Jewish mobsters Mickey Cohen and Moe Sedway as his lieutenants. He created the biggest prostitution ring, gambling and protection rackets in Las Vegas and Los Angeles. He also expanded into drug trafficking and bookmaking.

The family has had over 70 known members and associates in its history. In 1946, the family had about 63 known members.

Known members 
This is a list of known Siegel family members and associates.

Bosses 
 Benjamin Siegel: 1933-1947—Founder; Jewish mob boss; born in 1906, died in 1947 (41 years old).
 Mickey Cohen: 1947-1961—Siegel's right-hand man; Chicago Outfit associate; born in  1913, died in 1976 (62 years old).

Lieutenants 
 Moe Sedway: 1933-1952—Lieutenant; Lansky lieutenant; born in 1894, died in 1952 (58 years old).
 Jack Dragna: 1933-1956—Lieutenant; before he became boss of the L.A. family and rivaled Cohen; born in 1891, died in 1956 (64 years old).
 David Berman: 1933-1957—Lieutenant; casino owner; born in 1903, died in 1957 (54 years old).
 Edward "Neddie" Herbert: 1947-1949—Lieutenant and bodyguard; Cohen's trusted associate; born in 1907, died in 1949 (41 years old).
 Elihu "Black Dot" McGee: 1934-1960s—Racketeer; Cohen's African American partner in Los Angeles' South Central Ghetto; born in ?, died in ?
 Bill Bursteinowicz-Lieutenant; Bugsy Siegel and Mickey Cohen's closest friend and trusted associate, died in 1987.

Adviser 
 Meyer Lansky: 1933-1960—Adviser; Flamingo investor and Siegel's childhood friend; born in 1902, died in 1983 (80 years old).

Soldiers 
 Johnny Stompanato: 1947-1952—Enforcer and Bodyguard; Cohen's personal bodyguard;  born in 1925, died in 1958 (32 years old).
 Jack Whalen: 1941-1959—Enforcer; Siegel and Cohen's top hitman and bookmaker; born in 1918, died in 1959 (41 years old).
 David Ogul: 1940-1949—Bodyguard and robber; former Chicago associate; born in 1919, died in 1949 (30 years old).
 Harold "Happy" Meltzer: 1940s-1950s—Drug trafficker; Cohen's heroin trafficker; born in ?, died in ?
 Eddie Nealis: 1930s-1960s—Racketeer; gambler; Movie Producer, Casino Owner, Horse Track Operator, Oil Man, inspiration for Mr. Lucky, born Mar 18, 1899 in Los Angeles & Died May 5, 1969 in Los Angeles of a heart attack (70 years old)              
 Curly Robinson: 1930s-1950s—Racketeer; Nealis' partner; born in ?, died in ?
 William "Stumpy" Zevon (born 1903- 1976) was a Ukrainian-born Jewish mobster and member of the Cohen gang, headed by Los Angeles mobster Mickey Cohen. He was the father of rock musician Warren Zevon

Associates 
 Sam Rummel: 1930s-1950—Fixer; mob lawyer; born in, died in 1950
 Joseph Sica: ?-1961—Close associate; defied a hit order on Cohen; born in 1911, died in 1992 (81  years old)

Las Vegas Valley
Lists of criminals
Cohen crime family
Cohen crime family members
Jewish American gangsters